Waldron School District is a school district in Scott County, Arkansas.

References

External links
 

School districts in Arkansas